Jabal Ali (formerly Nakheel Harbour & Tower) is a rapid transit station on the Red Line of the Dubai Metro in Dubai, UAE.

The station is one of three stations on the system with a dedicated park and ride lot, the others being Centrepoint and Etisalat.

Until May 2020, the station was named Nakheel Harbour & Tower. The station was closed as it was being reconstructed to allow the platform and track layout to accommodate the Route 2020 extension. The station reopened on January 1, 2021.

Location
Jabal Ali station is in the southwestern section of Dubai, bordering the built-up developments of Jumeirah Lake Towers and the Dubai Marina. Specifically, it lies to the north of exit 29 on Sheikh Zayed Road.

Nearby development
Unlike most metro stations, there is no development near Jabal Ali. Its former namesake, Nakheel Harbour and Tower, was a planned large-scale development of around  that would have comprised Nakheel Tower, which would have been the tallest skyscraper in the world, as well as the world's largest inner-city marina. Due to the financial crisis of 2007-2008 and subsequent recession, the project never saw construction.

History
The station opened under the name of "Nakheel Harbour and Tower" as one of the original stations of the Dubai Metro, beginning service on 9 September 2009. At the time, it acted as the western terminus of the Red Line; an extension westward to the Ibn Battuta Mall opened on 30 April 2010, making Nakheel Harbour and Tower a through station.

The track layout east of Jabal Ali station was modified to create a new "Route 2020" branch to Expo 2020 and two additional platforms to the southeast which are used to serve the new route. The branch connects to the Red Line just to the northeast of the station. The extension was partially opened on 1 January 2021, with trains running a shuttle service between Jabal Ali and Al Furjan. The line was extended to Expo 2020 on 1 June 2021. The route is expected to have 275,000 users each day by 2030.

Station layout
As with many stations on the Red Line, Jabal Ali lies on a viaduct paralleling the eastern side of Sheikh Zayed Road. It is a type 1 elevated station with two side platforms and two tracks on the Red Line. It also connects to the Route 2020 branch line. Passengers access the station through a concourse at ground level.

Platform layout

References

Railway stations in the United Arab Emirates opened in 2009
Dubai Metro stations